Medical Lake is a small city in Spokane County, eastern Washington, United States. At the 2010 census, the population was 5,060. The city is the site of a psychiatric hospital, Eastern State Hospital, and of Fairchild Air Force Base, two major employers.

History
The city of Medical Lake was incorporated in 1890. The city took its name from the nearby eponymous lake.

The Spokane people, a Native American tribe which had long inhabited the area, believed the water and mud of the lake to possess curative properties.

White settlers such as Andrew Lefevre and Stanley Hallett, who moved to the area in the 1870s, promoted this belief and marketed the lake salts for medicinal uses. A salt and soap industry developed here, followed by the construction of commercial bath houses in the 1880s. This was a period when springs and spas were popular developments across the country.

Several resort hotels were constructed along the lake shore. In 1891, the state constructed Eastern State Hospital, and this further stimulated economic growth in the city. Such growth continued until the 1920s, when the lake declined in popularity as a tourist destination.

A period of stagnation was interrupted in the 1940s with the construction of nearby Fairchild Air Force Base to support the US effort in World War II. This brought a surge of population to the city. Medical Lake's economy continues to depend upon the institutional presence of Eastern State Hospital and Fairchild AFB. Many residents of the city commute to work in nearby Spokane, which has a more varied economy.

Geography

Medical Lake is located at  (47.571384, -117.683333).

The city lies to the east of the lake of the same name. There are many other lakes within a few miles of the city, including West Medical Lake, Silver Lake, Clear Lake, and numerous smaller lakes and ponds south of the city. Driving distance from downtown Spokane is 16 miles via Interstate 90 and Washington State Route 902, the latter of which runs through the city. Eastern State Hospital is situated across the lake to the west. Fairchild Air Force Base is located immediately north of the city.

Geologically, the city lies on basalt flows that were heavily eroded by catastrophic flooding at the end of the last Ice Age, making the city and its environs a part of the Channeled Scablands terrain.

Demographics

2010 census
As of the census of 2010, there were 5,060 people, 1,707 households, and 1,169 families living in the city. The racial makeup of the city was 88.0% White, 2.3% African American, 1.6% Native American, 2.0% Asian, 0.3% Pacific Islander, 1.5% from other races, and 4.3% from two or more races. Hispanic or Latino of any race were 5.7% of the population.

There were 1,707 households, of which 37.7% had children under the age of 18 living with them, 51.0% were married couples living together, 12.2% had a female householder with no husband present, 5.3% had a male householder with no wife present, and 31.5% were non-families. 25.5% of all households were made up of individuals, and 7.1% had someone living alone who was 65 years of age or older. The average household size was 2.55 and the average family size was 3.05.

The median age in the city was 36.8 years. 23.5% of residents were under the age of 18; 10.3% were between the ages of 18 and 24; 28.9% were from 25 to 44; 27.4% were from 45 to 64; and 10% were 65 years of age or older. The gender makeup of the city was 50.0% male and 50.0% female.

2000 census
As of the census of 2000, there were 3,758 people, 1,090 households, and 767 families living in the city. The population density was 1,090.8 people per square mile (420.6/km2). There were 1,197 housing units at an average density of 347.4 per square mile (134.0/km2). The racial makeup of the city was 88.88% White, 4.60% African American, 1.41% Native American, 1.57% Asian, 0.21% Pacific Islander, 1.01% from other races, and 2.32% from two or more races. Hispanic or Latino of any race were 4.12% of the population.

There were 1,090 households, out of which 40.8% had children under the age of 18 living with them, 50.4% were married couples living together, 15.1% had a female householder with no husband present, and 29.6% were non-families. 25.1% of all households were made up of individuals, and 7.2% had someone living alone who was 65 years of age or older. The average household size was 2.58 and the average family size was 3.07.

In the city, the age distribution of the population shows 24.3% under the age of 18, 9.1% from 18 to 24, 35.5% from 25 to 44, 22.9% from 45 to 64, and 8.2% who were 65 years of age or older. The median age was 36 years. For every 100 females, there were 108.2 males. For every 100 females age 18 and over, there were 104.2 males.

The median income for a household in the city was $42,159, and the median income for a family was $47,357. Males had a median income of $35,543 versus $23,971 for females. The per capita income for the city was $14,874. About 9.4% of families and 14.8% of the population were below the poverty line, including 12.3% of those under age 18 and 13.7% of those age 65 or over.

Gallery

References

External links
Official Website
Medical Lake -- Thumbnail History at HistoryLink

Cities in Washington (state)
Cities in Spokane County, Washington
1890 establishments in Washington (state)